Lynda Tolbert-Goode (born October 3, 1967, in Washington, D.C.) is a retired American hurdler and sprinter. She claimed the bronze medal in the women's 100 m hurdles event at the 1993 World Championships in Stuttgart, Germany.

Achievements
All results regarding 100m hurdles.

External links
 Lynda Tolbert-Goode at USATF
 
 
 

1967 births
Living people
American female sprinters
American female hurdlers
African-American female track and field athletes
Track and field athletes from Washington, D.C.
Olympic track and field athletes of the United States
Athletes (track and field) at the 1992 Summer Olympics
Athletes (track and field) at the 1996 Summer Olympics
World Athletics Championships athletes for the United States
World Athletics Championships medalists
21st-century African-American people
21st-century African-American women
20th-century African-American sportspeople
20th-century African-American women
20th-century African-American people